Tomlin is an English surname. Notable people with the surname include:

Alison Tomlin, British physical chemist and applied mathematician
Andrew J. Tomlin (1845–1906), American Marine; recipient of the Medal of Honor for action in the American Civil War
Bradley Walker Tomlin (1899–1955), American abstract expressionist painter
Chris Tomlin (born 1972), American Christian singer and songwriter
Claire J. Tomlin (born 1969), American systems researcher
Dave Tomlin (born 1949), American professional baseball player
E. W. F. Tomlin (1913–1988), British essayist
Gary Tomlin (contemporary), American television soap opera writer and producer
Gavin Tomlin (born 1983), English professional football player
George Napier Tomlin (1875–1947), British naval officer
Graham Tomlin (born 1958), British Anglican priest and author; Dean of St. Mellitus College
Jacob Tomlin (fl. 19th century), British author and missionary to China in the 19th century
John Read le Brockton Tomlin (1864–1954), British malacologist
Lee Tomlin (born 1989), English professional football player
Lily Tomlin (born 1939), American actress and comedian
Mark Vella Tomlin (1959–2010), Maltese pilot and actor
Mattson Tomlin (born 1990), Romanian screenwriter and producer
Mike Tomlin (born 1972), American professional football coach
Mollie Tomlin  (1923–2009), Australian watercolor artist
Pinky Tomlin (1907–1987), American jazz musician and actor
Randy Tomlin (born 1956), American professional baseball player
Ray S. Tomlin (fl. 1889–1929), American educator; president of Paine College in Augusta, Georgia
Robyn Tomlin (born 1971), American journalist and newspaper editor
Thomas Tomlin, Baron Tomlin (1867–1935), British jurist
William Tomlin, (1866–1910) English cricketer

Fictional characters
Vernon Tomlin, character on the British soap opera Coronation Street

See also
Tomalin, a similar surname

English-language surnames